Pugili is a 1995 Italian sports film directed by Lino Capolicchio, focusing on the world of boxing.

The movie won a FIPRESCI Prize in 1995.

Cast
Antonella Attili
Sara Di Giacinto
Pierfrancesco Favino - pugilist
Gianfelice Imparato
Letizia Generoso
Raffaele Angelino
Duilio Loi - himself
Franco Mescolini
Tiberio Mitri
Bobby Rhodes

See also
List of sports films

External links

1995 films
1990s sports drama films
Italian sports drama films
1990s Italian-language films
1995 drama films
Italian boxing films
1990s Italian films